Russell Richards (born 30 March 1962) is a former Australian rules footballer who played for Melbourne in the Victorian Football League (VFL).

A utility player from Seymour, Richards made his debut in round 1 during the 1983 season against  and played the first 19 games of the season to eventually win the Best First Year Player award at Melbourne. Richards played 81 games for Melbourne kicking 43 goals and his last game was in the 1987 Elimination Final win against .

References

External links
 
 Demonwiki profile

1962 births
Living people
Australian rules footballers from Victoria (Australia)
Melbourne Football Club players
Seymour Football Club players